Brachynemata is a genus of moths of the family Oecophoridae.

Species
Brachynemata aphanes  (Meyrick, 1884)
Brachynemata cingulata  Meyrick, 1885
Brachynemata diantha  (Meyrick, 1913)
Brachynemata epiphragma  (Meyrick, 1888)
Brachynemata ichneuta  (Meyrick, 1888)
Brachynemata leucanepsia  (Turner, 1940)
Brachynemata mimopa  (Meyrick, 1902)
Brachynemata ochrolitha  (Lower, 1903)
Brachynemata ombrodes  (Lower, 1897)
Brachynemata restricta  (Meyrick, 1920)

References

Markku Savela's ftp.funet.fi

 
Oecophorinae